Fetishism is a cult of inanimate things, expressed in deification or blind worship of these things.

Fetishism may also refer to:
 Commodity fetishism, a term in Karl Marx's critique of political economy
 Sexual fetishism, a sexual fixation on a nonliving object or nongenital body part

See also
 Fetish (disambiguation)